Henry Sutton (4 September 1855, Ballarat, Victoria – 28 July 1912) was an Australian designer, engineer, and inventor credited with contributions to early developments in electricity, aviation, wireless communication, photography and telephony.

Early life

Family
Henry Sutton, the second of the eleven children of Richard Henry Sutton (1831 – 1876), and Mary Sutton (1835 – 1894), née Johnson, was born in a tent on the Ballarat goldfields on 4 September 1855. He had three brothers, with whom he was associated in the Sutton Brothers musical business originally centred on Ballarat, and two sisters.  He married Elizabeth Ellen Wyatt (1860-1901) in 1881, and Annie May Tatti (1884-), on 17 September 1902, who bore four and two sons, respectively.

Education
Up to the age of ten, Sutton was schooled by his mother, then attended a state school, and then Gracefield college between 1869 and 1872. Sutton was self taught in the field of science, having read all the available books in
library of the Ballarat Mechanics’ lnstitute by the age of 14.

Sutton trained as a draftsman at the Ballarat School of Design where he won a silver medal and 30 other prizes for drawing.

Sutton studied at the Ballarat School of Mines.

Ballarat
Sutton lectured at the Ballarat School of Mines from 1883 to 1886.
In 1883, as a consequence of his work on batteries, Sutton was admitted as an associate of the Society of Telegraph Engineers and of Electricians. M. Louis Adolphe Cochery minister of Post and Telegraph Office in France invited Sutton to membership of the Société Internationale des Electriciens. Sutton was also offered membership of Electrical societies from America, Belgium and Russia.
In 1890 prior to leaving for England, a farewell dinner was held by the citizens of Ballarat, where Sutton was presented with an Illuminated address.

London: 1890–1893
Sutton registered Sutton's Process Syndicate in November 1891 at an address in London to exploit his Suttontype printing process.  The process was not considered particularly innovative and it was reported to be unreliable.  He abandoned the business to return to Australia.

In 1892, he was introduced to Nikola Tesla by Lord Rayleigh and William Preece.

On the return voyage to Australia in 1893, Sutton used his printing process to contribute pictures to a shipboard newspaper called the Red Sea Scorcher.

Melbourne
Sutton travelled with Alexander Graham Bell from Melbourne to Ballarat on 15 August 1910 where they discussed their respective discoveries.

Sutton died suddenly, at his residence ("Waltham", 9 Erskine Street, Malvern), on 28 July 1912, at the age of 56 and was buried in the Brighton Cemetery.

Inventions

Printing

Sutton's Suttontype process for converting photographs into a printing surface was patented in 1887.

Wireless telegraphy
Sutton discovered, and patented, a galena "detector" that had superior performance over other devices used to that time.

Sutton had also built the world's first portable radio and held a number of other patents relating to wireless transmission and reception.

Other endeavours

Aviation
Sutton built a clockwork-driven ornithopter operating on a fixed arm and presented two papers on flight to the Aeronautical Society of Great Britain, in 1878, entitled "On the Flight of Birds and Aërial Navigation" and "Second Paper on the Flight of Birds".

Batteries
In 1881, Sutton had developed a new rechargeable battery which was patented the following year.  He also wrote of a four-volt cell compound battery invention which was described as impossible by the English Mechanic and World of Science in 1890.

Lighting
Sutton demonstrated a light globe sixteen days after Edison's demonstration on 31 December 1879.

Subsequently Sutton's vacuum pump design which overcame deficiencies in the Sprengel pump, was used for the production of light globes by the Edison Swan company.

Telephony
After reading of Bell's 1876 announcement of the invention of the telephone, Sutton had designed about twenty different telephones within a year. Sutton was said to have "believed in the free flow of information as a gift to science ... patented little, although sixteen of his twenty original telephone designs were patented by others overseas".

The first Australian telephone connection was made in Ballarat and Ballarat East, linking fire stations in the two towns. The exact location of one of the telephone sets can be seen in the Ballarat East Fire Station. The device once allowed communication between the two fire brigades in Ballarat so that they could more accurately locate fires from their watch towers. Sutton had also wired up Sutton's Music Stores, his family business warehouses and offices, with a telephone network two years before an official Australian telephone system. Sutton devised a method for using gas and water pipes as part of a telephone circuit.

Microscopy
In 1885 after cholera outbreak on a ship in Queensland, Sutton obtained a slide and managed to photograph the cholera germ at 1000 times magnification. A letter to this effect, from Sutton, was published in The Argus on 28 December 1885.

Photography
In the 1880s Sutton also devised a colour photography process but, although examples of this work exist, he did not commercialize it.

Television
In 1885, Sutton designed, but did not construct, a mechanical television apparatus to see the Melbourne Cup in Ballarat.
Sutton had published his Telephane designs in 1890.  According to historian Ann Moyal, the concept was never successfully demonstrated:  "Sutton's 'TV system', which he called 'telephany', used all the latest technology, such as the recently-invented Kerr effect, the Nipkow disc (which Baird was to use in the 'twenties) and the selenium photocell. But its weak link in the 1870s was that the signal had to be transferred by telegraph lines, as radio had yet to arrive, and these were too slow to transmit the dashing horses of the Melbourne Cup successfully."

Facsimile
Sutton used his telephane system to demonstrate facsimile transmission with the help of Nicola Tesla in England. An account of his invention was later published in Washington in 1896, noting that the first patents for long-distance transmission of images dated back to 1867.

Lifts
For the benefit of his mother, who had been paralyzed by a stroke, a new hydraulic lift had been installed in the newly built Suttons Music Emporium. As Ballarat's low water pressure and lack of an efficient drainage system were incompatible, Sutton designed and built a new hydraulic mechanism to drive the lift. This design was subsequently used by the Austral Otis company and exported for use in America.

Automotive

"Henry Sutton can be classed as an automobile inventor and designer rather than a manufacturer whose achievements were considerable and internationally recognized. As an inventor he produced a number of automobiles of his own design in an evolutionary process (somewhere between six and eight)."  In 1897, a tricycle fitted with a Sutton designed and built engine was driven from Melbourne to Ballarat. Despite atrocious road conditions the trip was completed in eleven and a half hours, and the vehicle arrived in Ballarat to a crowd of thousands.
From 1898 Sutton held patents for improvements in combustion engine carburettors; and, by 1899, he had built and driven the Sutton Autocar, one of the first motor cars in Australia.

Automobile Club of Victoria
Sutton was a founding member of the Automobile Club of Victoria; and, at its inaugural meeting, on 10 December 1903, Sutton's proposed "objects of the club" were unanimously accepted by all present:
"that the objects of the club should be the promotion of a social organisation and club, composed mainly of persons owning self-propelled vehicles or motor cycles; to afford a means of recording the experiences of members and others using motor cars and motor cycles; to promote investigation in their development; to co-operate in securing rational legislation and the formation of proper rules and regulations governing the use of motor cars and motor cycles in cities, towns and country districts; to maintain the lawful rights and privileges and protect the interests of owners and users of all forms of self-propelled vehicles whenever and wherever such interests, rights and privileges are menaced; to promote and encourage the improvement, construction and maintenance of roads and highways and the development generally in this State of motoring, and to maintain a club to be devoted to the interests and advancement of automobilism."

Legacy

Henry Sutton Circuit
On 20 January 2004, several streets in the new Canberra suburb of Dunlop were named after "inventors, inventions, and artists"; and one of these new streets was called "Henry Sutton Circuit".

The Henry Sutton Oration
In 2014, the Telecommunications Association (formerly known as the Telecommunications Society of Australia, which had its origins in the Telegraph Electrical Society, founded in Melbourne in 1874), inaugurated its annual Henry Sutton Oration.

Poetry
Les Murray referred to Sutton and television in his 1990 poem "The Tube".

The Science Show
Science journalist Robyn Williams has featured Sutton in episodes of his long-running radio program.

Notes

References

Footnotes

Family footnotes

Patents

External links 
 Sutton, allcarindex.com.
 Cansdale, Dominic, "Henry Sutton pioneered modern batteries and television so why have we forgotten 'Australia's Edison'?", ABC Ballarat, 4 December 2018.
 The legacy of Henry Sutton by Mike Smyth, Electronics Online
 Patent records held in Canberra – Fact sheet 265, National Archives of Australia.

Henry Sutton Familysearch

1855 births
1912 deaths
19th-century Australian inventors
Australian physicists
Australian automotive pioneers
Aviation pioneers
Academic staff of the Federation University Australia
Federation University Australia alumni
Independent scientists
Ornithopters
People associated with electricity
People from Ballarat
Pioneers of photography
Radio pioneers
Television pioneers